The Life and Miracles of Saint Thecla is an anonymous Greek hagiography of Thecla, the reputed follower of Paul of Tarsus, written between 468 and 476. It consists of two books, the first a biography and the second an account of 46 posthumous miracles wrought by Thecla. The Life is an expansion of the earlier Greek Acts of Thecla. The full Life and Miracles is about ten times longer than the Acts.

The Life circulated independently of the Miracles, but the Miracles was always transmitted with the Life. There are a total of twelve manuscripts of the Life, but only four of those include the Miracles. The manuscripts that include the Miracles are:
Vaticanus gr. 1667 (10th century), which is lacunose
Mosquensis synod 26 (11th century)
Atheniensis 2095 (12th century), which is in the best condition
Vaticanus gr. 1853 (10th century), a palimpsest with only fragments of the Life and Miracles

The Life and Miracles is an anonymous work written in Seleucia. In the Middle Ages, it was usually attributed to Bishop Basil of Seleucia, a contemporary of the actual author. This may have been based on the remark by Photios in the 9th century that Basil wrote an verse account of the deeds of Thecla. As the Life and Miracles is prose, it cannot be the work mentioned. In fact, the author remarks that Basil excommunicated him for a time. Nevertheless, he is still often known as Pseudo-Basil of Seleucia.


Notes

Bibliography

Editions

Secondary literature

5th-century Christian texts
Christian hagiography